Marco Fortin (born 8 July 1974) is an Italian football goalkeeper who plays for Calvi Noale in Eccellenza Veneto. During his playing career, Fortin frequently wore the number 14 shirt, as the pronunciation of his surname sounded similar to the number fourteen in English.

Career

Early career
Fortin spent his first 7 seasons of his career in the lower divisions of Italian football.

Siena
Fortin joined Siena in July 2002. In his first season, he served as the first choice goalkeeper for the Serie B runners-up, as they won promotion to the Italian top division. In his second season with Siena, and his first Serie A season, he lost his place in the starting line-up to Generoso Rossi. In the 2004–05 season, both Fortin and Alex Manninger shared the role of the club's first choice keeper. In the next season, he became Antonio Mirante's backup. In July 2006, he joined Cagliari and worked as Antonio Chimenti's backup. In 2007–08 season he was the first choice goalkeeper ahead Jan Koprivec and Vincenzo Marruocco. In December 2007 he lost his place to Marruocco, and in January 2008 the club signed Marco Storari. Fortin and Marruocco left the club in late January.

References

External links
La Calvi Noale si assicura l’esperto Fortin (’74) – La Nuova Venezia e Mestre 
Marco Fortin Profile at AIC 

1974 births
Living people
Italian footballers
Italian expatriate footballers
Inter Milan players
S.S.D. Pro Sesto players
Treviso F.B.C. 1993 players
A.C.N. Siena 1904 players
Cagliari Calcio players
L.R. Vicenza players
AEK Larnaca FC players
Serie A players
Serie B players
Cypriot First Division players
Association football goalkeepers
Expatriate footballers in Cyprus
Footballers from Venice
S.E.F. Torres 1903 players